Jonathan Sacerdoti is a British broadcaster, journalist and TV producer based in the United Kingdom. He covers stories relating to the UK and Europe, as well as terrorism and extremism stories, race relations, Middle East analysis and the British royal family. He is also a campaigner against antisemitism.

Early life and education 
Sacerdoti was born in London. He is a graduate of Oxford University having studied English Language and Literature at Balliol College, Oxford.

Career

Broadcast 
As a reporter or expert analyst Sacerdoti has appeared on international TV channels including Sky News, BBC News, ITV news, Channel 4 News, Fox News, Al Jazeera English, NDTV and France 24. In 2013 he became UK correspondent for i24news and in 2020 appeared as a regular UK correspondent on the financial news network Cheddar News. In 2022 he started to cover the British royal family on Fox News  and also recorded the Fox documentary “Who is King Charles III?” In America he is a regular guest commentator on E! Channel’s Daily Pop as a UK expert. He has also appeared regularly as a co-host and guest on the American publication Us Weekly’s podcasts.

His work as a voice artist includes narrating an English language audiobook of the Quran in 2019.

Journalism and writing 
He writes regularly for various publications including the Daily Express and The Spectator. He had his first byline in a national newspaper when he was 17 years old, writing for The Daily Telegraph. He is a Special Correspondent for the Jewish Chronicle newspaper, covering investigations features and major news stories.

In 2020, Sacerdoti was part of a consortium of business and media figures  which acquired the London-based Jewish Chronicle newspaper. The newspaper was founded in 1841 and is the oldest continuously published Jewish newspaper in the world. It had announced its intention to seek a creditor’s voluntary liquidation, with 54 journalists and support staff told they would be made redundant, an outcome which was avoided through the consortium’s acquisition of the newspaper.

TV Production 
Sacerdoti worked as a television producer on the Channel 4 breakfast news programme RI:SE and on the Channel 5 news discussion programme The Wright Stuff. He has also worked as a development producer on entertainment and factual programmes for various production companies, including Endemol, where his original format “My Childhood” was commissioned by the BBC and won BAFTA Scotland’s Best Factual Programme 2006. Whilst at Endemol, he worked on the development of the UK version of Deal or No Deal. Between 2005 and 2006, he worked at ITV, and then at Shine TV until 2007. He also set up his own communications and design practice, Sacerdoti Creative Consultancy.

Voluntary work and campaigning
He was a founding trustee of the charity Campaign Against Antisemitism and its Director of Communications until August 2016.

Sacerdoti is a trustee of the Simon Wiesenthal Centre's United Kingdom branch.

He is on the council of The Montefiore Endowment, a charity which administers the endowment of the 19th-century British philanthropist Sir Moses Montefiore. He also represented the Spanish and Portuguese Jews' Congregation on the Board of Deputies of British Jews and has been a member of its International Division.

Antiracism 
As a journalist and a campaigner Sacerdoti has made many high profile public statements about antisemitism and other racisms, as well as about the Holocaust. He has spoken about the racial persecution his father experienced as a child under the Italian Racial Laws,and written about the members of the Florentine Catholic Church who hid and saved his father as a child during the Shoah. He argues that true anti-racism requires individuals to act fairly to protect each other, using the example of the Catholic priests and nuns who saved his father’s life: “When faced with the question of what our duty is as citizens of the world, each of us can choose to make a difference, just as they did.” 

He is critical of the use of the acronyms BAME and BIPOC because they exclude Jewish, Gypsy, Roma and Travellers of Irish Heritage groups, and because they create “linguistic opacity.” 

He was also critical of Whoopi Goldberg’s comments on The View when she said that the Holocaust was not about race, calling her comments “absolute nonsense” and “outrageous”. He questioned Goldberg’s claims of being Jewish and argued against her use of a Jewish stage name, as well as her writing racist anti-black jokes for a white comedian to deliver in blackface. Sacerdoti also criticised Children’s author Roald Dahl’s anti-Jewish racism, suggesting that his “antisemitic attitudes were, and probably remain, widespread among some parts of British society.”

He has also written extensively about antisemitism in Arabic language TV broadcasts as well as about positive interactions between Jews and Arabs in the Middle East.

Lectures 
Sacerdoti has spoken both as a keynote speaker and as a panellist at international conferences organised by Harvard University, National Chengchi University in Taiwan, the American University in Dubai and Keio University in Tokyo. He has given lectures on the nature of terrorism in Europe. He has debated at the Oxford and Cambridge Union.

BBC News 
He has appeared regularly on BBC News programmes, including on BBC Radio 4’s Today programme and The Moral Maze. He was a regular panellist on BBC World’s Dateline London.

Awards 
In 2001 Sacerdoti was awarded the Oxford University OxTALENT prize for IT and literature.

In 2010 he was awarded the World Zionist Organization's "Herzl Award".

References 

Living people
British television journalists
Alumni of Balliol College, Oxford
Year of birth missing (living people)